Rugby Sevens competition has been in the Universiade  in 2013 and will return in 2019 as optional sport.

Events

Medal table 
Last updated after the 2019 Summer Universiade

References 
International Rugby Board

 
Sports at the Summer Universiade
Universiade